Upton, also known as the David Stewart Residence or Dammann Mansion, is a historic home located at Baltimore, Maryland, United States. It is a large brick Greek Revival mansion constructed about 1838 as the country residence of David Stewart (1800-1858), a prominent Baltimore attorney and politician.  It is  stories high on a raised basement, three bays wide and two rooms deep, with a center-passage plan.  In the late 1950s, a brick stair tower was constructed when the building was adapted for public school use.In February 2023 a Federal Grant with over $ 2,2 million was announced to help create this property as the headquarters of Afro Newspaper, an African American owned paper published in Baltimore since 1892. Afro Charities is the awardee of the grant which will also help to digitize thousands of images and copies of the newspaper; https://www.wbaltv.com/article/the-afro-american-newspaper-archives-history-preservation-upton-mansion/42866107

Upton was listed on the National Register of Historic Places in 1994. Upton is included in the Baltimore National Heritage Area.

References

External links
, including photo from 1993, at Maryland Historical Trust
High Ground, Low Profile (retrieved May 14, 2010)
Upton - Explore Baltimore Heritage

Houses on the National Register of Historic Places in Baltimore
Houses in Baltimore
Greek Revival houses in Maryland
Houses completed in 1838
Baltimore National Heritage Area
Upton, Baltimore
Baltimore City Landmarks